Si is a given name, which is often a nickname or a short version of Simon, Silas, or other names. It may refer to the following notable people:
Si Begg (born 1972), English electronic dance music DJ, musician and record producer
Si Genaro (born 1971), British musician 
Si Cranstoun (born 1971), British singer
Si Kahn (born 1944), American singer-songwriter and activist
Si Phyo (born 1990), Burmese actor
 Si Robertson (born 1948), American television personality
Si Schroeder (born Simon Kenny), Irish music artist 
Si Siman (born Ely E. Siman Jr.; 1921–1994), American country music executive
Si Yew Ming (born 1979), Malaysian tennis player

See also
Sy